KOEL (950 kHz) is an AM radio station serving Waterloo, Cedar Falls and surrounding cities with a news/talk/classic country format. The station is under the ownership of Townsquare Media. Despite different owners and affiliations, KOEL and KWWL maintain a strong partnership.

On August 30, 2013, a deal was announced in which Townsquare would acquire 53 Cumulus Media stations, including KOEL, for $238 million. The deal was part of Cumulus' acquisition of Dial Global; Townsquare and Dial Global are both controlled by Oaktree Capital Management. The sale to Townsquare was completed on November 14, 2013.

Programming
On weekdays, KOEL-AM broadcasts news/talk programming as well as local agriculture business, sports reports, community calendar, lunch specials and stock market reports, with ABC News broadcast on the hour, along with Oelwein Huskies play by play.

At weekends, KOEL has brief news breaks from ABC News with home improvement tips, field and stream radio, and classic country music (when not in special programming mode).

Staff
Roger King - News Director/Farm Director
Johnny Marks - Brand Manager

References

External links
AM 950 KOEL Facebook
AM 950 KOEL - Official Site

OEL
News and talk radio stations in the United States
Country radio stations in the United States
Radio stations established in 1951
Townsquare Media radio stations
1951 establishments in Iowa